Eric Granado Santos (born 10 June 1996) is a Brazilian Grand Prix motorcycle racer. He currently competes in the MotoE World Cup, aboard an Energica Ego Corsa.,
He was the 2017 FIM CEV Moto2 European Championship winner.

He competed in the FIM CEV Moto2 European Championship in 2015, 2016 and 2017 aboard a Kalex Moto2.

Career statistics

FIM CEV Moto2 European Championship

Races by year
(key) (Races in bold indicate pole position, races in italics indicate fastest lap)

Grand Prix motorcycle racing

By season

By class

Races by year
(key) (Races in bold indicate pole position, races in italics indicate fastest lap)

 Half points awarded as less than two thirds of the race distance (but at least three full laps) was completed.

Superbike World Championship

By season

Races by year
(key) (Races in bold indicate pole position) (Races in italics indicate fastest lap)

* Season still in progress.

References

External links

1996 births
Living people
Sportspeople from São Paulo
Brazilian motorcycle racers
Moto2 World Championship riders
Moto3 World Championship riders
MotoE World Cup riders
Superbike World Championship riders